Émile Mathieu may refer to:

 Émile Léonard Mathieu (1835–1890), French mathematician
 Émile Mathieu (composer) (1844–1932), Belgian composer
 Émile Mathieu (aviator), pioneer Belgian aviator